The Incorporated Village of Westbury is a village in the Town of North Hempstead in Nassau County, on Long Island, in New York, United States. The population was 15,404 at the 2020 census.

History
The first settlers arrived in 1658 in the region known as the Hempstead Plains. Many of the early settlers were Quakers.

Westbury's Jericho Turnpike, which provides connection to Mineola and Syosset as well as to the Long Island Expressway (or LIE), was once a trail used by the Massapequa Indians. As far back as the 17th century, it served as a divider between the early homesteads north of the Turnpike and the Hempstead Plains to its south. Today, it serves as a state highway complex.

In 1657, Captain John Seaman purchased  from the Algonquian Tribe of the Massapequa Indians. In 1658, Richard Stites and his family built their homestead in this area. Theirs was the only family farm until an English Quaker, Edmond Titus, and his son Samuel joined them and settled in an area of Hempstead Plains, known today as the Village of Westbury. In 1675 Henry Willis, also an English Quaker, named the area "Westbury", after Westbury, Wiltshire, his hometown in England. Other Quaker families who were also seeking a place to freely express their religious beliefs joined the Tituses and Willises. The first Society of Friends meeting house was built in 1700. The early history of Westbury and that of the Friends are so interconnected that they are essentially the same.

These settlers, like many other landowners throughout the colonies, owned slaves. In 1775, compelled by their religious beliefs, the Quakers freed all 154 African-Americans that they owned. Many of these freed men and women built their own homesteads on the open land near the sheep grazing pastures. Their new community consisted of farms and dairies. In 1834, with Quaker assistance, they and their descendants built the New Light Baptist Church. In 1867 the congregation moved to 247 Grand Boulevard, and in 1892 changed their name to Westbury A.M.E. Zion Church. In 2014, the congregation celebrated its 180th anniversary. The building still stands on the corner of Union Ave. and Grand Blvd.

The outbreak of the American Revolution disrupted Westbury's tranquility. From the beginning of the war until 1783, British soldiers and German-speaking mercenaries occupied local homes, confiscated livestock, and cleared the woods for firewood for the troops. With the close of the war, Westbury received its third group of settlers, the Hessians, mostly from Hesse-Cassel in the Holy Roman Empire, who chose not to return to their home country. Instead, they remained in an area now known as New Cassel, a name chosen in honor of the part of Hesse from which most had come.

By 1837, the Long Island Rail Road had built through Westbury. Schedules from March 1837 mention a stop at Westbury, but by June list Carle Place instead, with schedules from 1842 listing both.
In 1840, the first public school was built. The railroad made it easier for Italian and Irish immigrants to work Westbury's farms and in 1857, St. Brigid's Parish was founded.

At the same time more African-American families came to the area via the Underground Railroad. For some, Westbury was only one stop on the way to Canada, but several stayed in this area after being harbored in secret rooms in the homes of the Quakers. In the years after the Civil War, until near the turn of the century, the few stores that comprised the small village around the railroad depot, were mainly black owned.

The Village moved from its agricultural setting in the late 19th century when the very wealthy began to settle and build mansions. This area is now known as Old Westbury. Post Avenue soon became a commerce center to serve the surrounding estates. Various estate workers began to move in as well. Streets were mapped out and constructed. Post Avenue received electricity in 1902 and in 1914 a water company was founded.

From the 1850s to the 1900s, Westbury's population and ethnic diversity began to rise as many people of Irish and Italian origins continued to settle. New Cassel began to be developed in the first quarter of the 20th century.

In 1927, Charles Lindbergh took off from Roosevelt Field, a couple of hundred yards south of downtown, for the history-making flight to Paris, marking probably the most famous event tied to Westbury.

In response to a rumor that northern Westbury planned to incorporate, thereby leaving the southern part without a name, residents collected enough petitions for third class incorporation in 1932. The Village included Grantsville, the section south of Union Avenue around A.M.E. Zion church, but did not take in New Cassel, since the few families that lived there thought it would only unnecessarily increase their taxes.

In 1938, the Northern State Parkway was constructed and in 1940, Roosevelt Raceway. In 1941, the Second World War began. Westbury sent 1,400 persons to serve the country. This was 20% of the community's population, making it the highest percentage of any comparable community in the United States.

In the mid-1950s, Westbury virtually ran out of undeveloped land and with it came the end of the building boom. In 1940, Westbury listed its population at 4,525. By 1960, Westbury's population had grown to 14,757, according to the census data for that year. Many Caribbean and Latin American families began to settle during this time and in the decades that followed.

On 8 September 1974, Crosby, Stills & Nash performed at the Roosevelt Raceway.

As the birth rate declined, people married at a later age and the high cost of buying a home prevented many people from assuming a mortgage in the 1970s, Westbury again underwent change, becoming more urban and city-like over time.

Geography

In addition to Westbury Village itself, unincorporated regions surrounding its borders also use the Westbury name, including New Cassel, Salisbury (South Westbury) and parts of Jericho. For example, the  Westbury Music Fair performing venue (now known as the NYCB Theatre at Westbury), located in the Westbury postal zone, is part of the Jericho hamlet.

The region is grouped under the name Greater Westbury, a region that also includes organizations with common interests, such as those in New Cassel. The school districts that serve the Greater Westbury region, based on the boundaries, are Westbury (including New Cassel) (Westbury Union District) and East Meadow (Clark District). The only homes zoned for East Meadow Schools are actually located in the Hamlet of Salisbury, which is in the Town of Hempstead.

Demographics

As of the 2010 US Census, there were 15,146 people, 5,078 households, and 3,523 families residing in the village. The racial makeup of the village was 55% White, 22% African American, 6.0% Asian, 13% from other races, and 3.8% from two or more races. Hispanic or Latino were 27% of the population.

There were 5,078 households, out of which 31.0% had children under the age of 18 living with them, 52.4% were married couples living together, 11.6% had a female householder with no husband present, and 30.6% were non-families. 24.4% of all households were made up of individuals, and 8.1% had someone living alone who was 65 years of age or older. The average household size was 3.0 and the average family size was 3.5.

In 2010, the US Census Bureau estimated the median income for a household in the village was $80,000 and the median income for a family was $92,000. The per capita income for the village was $34,000. About 4.4% of families and 6.2% of the population were below the poverty line, including 7.6% of families with children under age 18 and 9.2% of children under age 18.

Westbury is made up of Italian Americans, African-Americans, Hispanic-Americans and Caribbeans; particularly Haitians, Guyanese, and Jamaicans. Many of the Hispanics are of Salvadoran, Honduran, and Mexican origin. Many of the remaining Italian-Americans in the village trace their origins to the town of Durazzano in Southern Italy, and are closely related. A great number still reside on the Hill across from Saint Brigid's Church. The nickname for the Village, "A Community for All Seasons,"  was adapted after The Greater Westbury Community Coalition ran a slogan contest shortly after the 1966 release of the Oscar-winning Best Movie-- “A Man for All Seasons.” The film was about Sir Thomas More who was portrayed as a man of the utmost principle. The winning slogan: “A Community For All Seasons” was a take-off on the movie’s title and was meant to suggest that Westbury was a good place to live, a place that stood for accepting people of all sorts, a community that embraced diversity

Education
The village is served primarily by the Westbury Union Free School District, although the westernmost portions of the village are served by the Carle Place Union Free School District.

Transportation
Westbury is served by the Main Line of the Long Island Rail Road with connection to Penn Station, Hicksville and Port Jefferson. It is also served by the following bus routes operated by Nassau Inter-County Express:
 n22: Jamaica—Hicksville via Hillside Avenue & Prospect Avenue
 n22X: Jamaica—Hicksville via Hillside Avenue & Prospect Avenue
 n24: Jamaica—Hicksville via Jericho Turnpike & Old Country Road
 n35: Westbury—Baldwin

Westbury hosts New York TRACON, the approach control for several neighbor airports, including JFK, Newark and LaGuardia.

Notable people
 Bud Anderson (born 1956), Major League Baseball player, attended Clarke High School, Westbury
 Sarah Ban Breathnach, author
 Michael Cimino (1939–2016), Academy Award-winning film director of The Deer Hunter, attended Clarke High School, Salisbury
 Kevin Conroy (1955–2022), actor, voice of Batman in Batman: The Animated Series and Justice League
 Arthur Dobrin (born 1943), author and professor at Hofstra University
 Tom Donohue (born 1952), former catcher for the California Angels.
 Doctor Dré (born 1963), co-host of Yo! MTV Raps with Ed Lover and radio DJ
 Freddie Foxx a.k.a Bumpy Knuckles in associated acts with Eric B., Gang Starr, Gang Starr Foundation, etc.
 Paul Hewitt (born 1963), men's basketball head coach at George Mason University and Georgia Tech
 Skip Jutze (born 1946), Major League Baseball player, Houston Astros, Seattle Mariners, St. Louis Cardinals.
 Ron Klimkowski (1944–2009), Major League Baseball player, attended Clarke High School, Westbury 
 Nancy McKeon (born 1966), actress
 Philip McKeon (1964–2019), actor
 Bill O'Reilly (born 1949), Fox News talk show host
 DJ Rekha (born 1971), credited with starting New York's South Asian bhangra scene
 Irene Rosenfeld (born 1953), CEO of major corporations; born in Westbury and attended Clarke High School
 Joel Ross, tennis player
 Joe Satriani (born 1956), virtuoso guitarist, composer, producer and guitar teacher
 Tyson Walker (born 2000), college basketball player for the Michigan State Spartans
 Spann Watson (1916–2010), Tuskegee Airman, was a longtime resident of Westbury
 Geeta Citygirl (born 1971), actor (SAG-AFTRA, AEA) and founding artistic director of SALAAM Theatre (birthed in 2000 in NY, NY), the first South Asian not-for-profit, professional, theater company celebrating in America. Resident in the Village of Westbury and member of Westbury Arts.

References

External links
 Westbury official website
 Westbury Memorial Public Library Current home of the Historical Society of the Westburys

Town of North Hempstead, New York
Villages in New York (state)
Villages in Nassau County, New York